Park Yu-ha (박유하, 朴裕河; born March 25, 1957) is a professor at the College of Liberal Arts, Sejong University. Her research focuses on Japanese-Korean relations. Her 2013 book Comfort Women of the Empire criticized the Korean interpretation of comfort women as exclusively "sex slaves". Her critics point out that she provides intellectual legitimacy to the Japanese historical revisionism.

Academic career 
Park graduated from Keio University in 1981. She earned an M.A. from Waseda University in 1989 and a Ph.D. in 1993.

Comfort Women of the Empire

Synopsis 
In her most controversial book Comfort Women of the Empire, Park challenged an established description of imperial Japan's military comfort station system.

Based on historical documents and the testimony of comfort women, including several cases of comfort women who fell in love with Japanese soldiers, a soldier who took care of a sick woman, or soldiers who helped comfort women to return their home country, Park asserts the existence of hidden comfort women who have been excluded from the mainstream narrative of comfort women, mainly consisting of "Japanese military coerced Korean women" and "sex-slaves". She describes a more complex relationship between the comfort women and soldiers.

She said this kind of "comrade-like relationship" tragedy, which is basically a co-operative relationship of mobilized weak people by the name of patriotism, was a result of Japan's colonization of Korea. Since Japan and Korea were superficially not distinguished as separate countries during the period of Japan's Korean annexation, the act of forcibly arresting Korean women could not have officially taken place, rather the dealers sold women to the "comfort station" by deception.

Park says requesting Japan take legal responsibility is not effective, considering the colonial status of Korea and the existence of the Treaty on Basic Relations between Japan and the Republic of Korea, and criticizes Jong-Dae-Hyup, (정대협, the main comfort women supporting NGO in South Korea) which has focused on the legal responsibility of Japan. Furthermore, excluding other comfort women's stories which do not fit into the pre-existing image of "pure innocent teen girls who were arrested by Japanese soldiers and coerced to be sex-slaves" is actually suppressing the real victims and makes the victim groups separated.

Therefore, considering the historical situation, the Treaty on Basic Relations between Japan and the Republic of Korea in 1965, and the apology and compensation of Japan in the 1990s, Park claims that requesting responsibility for Japan's colonial domination is required, rather than trying to urge Japan to accept legal liability for the War.

While she does state that Korea must face the truth correctly in order to hold Japan properly responsible for its offences, she also criticizes Japan at the same time, for the rightwing extremists in Japan excuse their responsibility by the treaty between Japan and Korea in 1965 and the compensation in 1990. While Park acknowledges the treaty in 1965, she avers that Japan took legal responsibilities only for the individuals as per the necessary process after the War, and also, she censures the compensation of 1990 for failing to be disseminated throughout Korea due to the Japanese government’s ambiguous attitude.

Park argues that Japan should apologize for their actions of colonial domination and the case for the Korean comfort women, both due to international significance and to allow for the opportunity of Asian integration or co-operation in the near future.

Editions 
A Japanese language version of the book was published in Japan in November 2014.

On 1 February 2016, Park made the book available online hoping to help solve the comfort women issue.

Controversy 
Park's book Comfort women of the Empire contains a significantly different narrative about comfort women compared to the previously accepted narratives, as it describes in depth of the imperialistic exploits by Japan, patriarchal system in Korea and also capitalistic exploits of the "dealers". This explanation brought fierce anger from the comfort women supporters, since her explanation were analyzed as "virtually an exoneration to Japan" from the critics.
Chong Yung-hwan, Professor at the Meiji Gakuin University criticized "Comfort women of Empire" for misinterpreting and distorting basic source and previous research, and advocating colonialism. 
Nine former comfort women in Nanume-Jip (나눔의 집), seeking to ban sales of the book, filed suit in both civil and criminal court, claiming that the scholar had defamed them. She was asked to pay 10 million won, or $8,262, to each of nine women. She was also accused by a Korean prosecutor.

On 25 November 2015, against the indictment of Park, 54 Japanese scholars and intellectuals including Kenzaburō Ōe (大江 健三郎, Nobel Laureate) Tomiichi Murayama (村山 富市, former Prime minister of Japan), Yōhei Kōno (河野 洋平, former Minister of Foreign Affairs of Japan) and Chizuko Ueno (上野 千鶴子, professor, Tokyo University) addressed statements supporting Park Yu-ha, and asking for the Korean government's withdrawal of the accusation and criticizing South Korean prosecutors for “suppressing the freedom of scholarship and press.” 190 Korean intellectuals also followed the statements. On January 17, 2017, Professor Noam Chomsky at MIT and Professor Bruce Cumings at University of Chicago joined in the previous statements addressed by Japanese scholars previously, with requesting immediate withdrawal of presecusion or sentence 'Not guilty', with supporting Park Yu-ha.

South Korean major scholars argue that it is right to legally ban the book Comfort Women of the Empire. According to them, Park Yu-ha's view on the issue of Japanese Military Sexual Slavery should be treated the same as the way Holocaust denial is handled in Europe.

On January 25, 2017, the 11th criminal division of Seoul Dongbu District Court acquitted Park on the defamation charges.

Works
 
 
An English summary by author. March 28, 2015 
 [Book Review] 
 [Book Review] 
 
 
Chapter of Comfort women (in Korean) 
 [Book Review]

See also
New Right (South Korea)
An Byeong-jik
Lee Young-hoon
Tochak Waegu
Diary of a Japanese military brothel manager

References

External links
 

1957 births
Comfort women
Living people
Academic staff of Sejong University
Historical revisionism of Comfort women
Keio University alumni
Waseda University alumni